Mario Bernasconi may refer to:

Mario Bernasconi (general) (1892–1976), Italian general 
Mario Bernasconi (sculptor) (1899–1963), Swiss-Italian sculptor